Rite of Spring (Portuguese: Acto da Primavera) is a 1963 Portuguese film directed by Manoel de Oliveira, his second feature.

The poet and director António Reis was the film's assistant director, and his influence can be felt deeply throughout it. (The film was included in the film program The School of Reis in 2012.)

Synopsis 
The inhabitants of Curalha, a small village in western Portugal, perform the Passion of Jesus every year according to text from about the 16th century, a tradition upon which Oliveira stumbled during the production of a film in 1963. The film is also remembered for "a furious apocalyptic montage that links Christ's death to the violence and lunacy of the Vietnam era".

See also 
 Docufiction
 List of docufiction films
 Ethnofiction

References

External links 
 

1963 films
Films directed by Manoel de Oliveira
Portuguese drama films
1960s Portuguese-language films